The Houston City Hall building is the headquarters of the City of Houston's municipal government.  Constructed during 1938 and 1939, the City Hall complex is located on Bagby Street on the western side of Downtown Houston. It is surrounded by the Houston Skyline District and is similar in design to dozens of other city halls built in the southwest United States during the same time period. City Hall is flanked by Tranquility Park and the Houston Public Library. The simply designed structure featured many construction details that have helped to make this building an architectural classic.

History
 
From 1841 to 1939, Houston's municipal government was headquartered at Old Market Square. It was destroyed by fire in the 1870s, and also in 1901, and rebuilt each time. In those days, City Hall was part of the lively commercial atmosphere of the Square. However, by the 1920s, the city leaders decided the site was no longer appropriate for their needs.

In 1929, the city's planning commission urged the establishment of a civic center around a downtown park, Herman Square. However, the Great Depression sidetracked the plans for the new center. When President Franklin Delano Roosevelt instituted the Works Progress Administration program, the city applied for a WPA grant to help finance the construction of a new City Hall. The grant was approved, and construction began in March 1938, continuing for 20 months.

Joseph Finger had designed the city hall building in a stripped classical style. He wanted to place on the front terrace statues of John Kirby Allen and Augustus Chapman Allen, but the City of Houston lacked the funds needed to add the statues. The statues would have cost $8,000 and the city was still suffering from the Great Depression. The Texas Star Chapter of the Daughters of the Republic of Texas (DRT) discovered this fact from reading a November 1939 article of the Scripps Howard Houston Press and publicized it in 2010. The statue project was dropped by the DRT chapter and the Oran M. Roberts Chapter 440, UDC, stepped in and raised the funds to have the Allen Brothers statues commissioned and cast in bronze.

On July 15, 2008, world-renowned surgeon Dr. Michael E. Debakey lay in repose in Houston City Hall after he died the previous Friday due to natural causes, the first such honor for any deceased resident of the city.

Usage

The Mayor of Houston and City Controller have their offices in this building. Council Members have their offices immediately across the street at the City Hall Annex building. Tuesdays at 1:30pm, and Wednesdays at 9:00am, Houston City Council meets in the chamber. All meetings are open to the public.

Beginning in October 2013, 12,000 Square feet of space on the West side of the first floor was renovated for use by HTV Houston Television ( HTV studios ). The renovations were overseen by Balfour Beatty Construction and were completed on March 14, 2014.

Architectural details

The architect of the City Hall was Joseph Finger, an Austrian-born Texan architect responsible for a number of Houston-area landmarks.

The exterior of the building features a sculpture by Herring Coe and Raoul Josset, and regional white, pock-market Texas limestone. The front faces Hermann Square, accessible by a series of paved terraces and stairs. The City hired Hare and Hare of Kansas City to design the rectangular pool and its surrounding landscaping, which includes lawns, rows of shrubs, and live oak trees.

The design on the lobby floor depicts the protective role of government. In the grillwork above the main entrances are medallions of "great lawgivers" from ancient times to the founding of America, including Thomas Jefferson, Charlemagne, Julius Caesar and Moses, and an outdated city seal adorns the interior doorknobs.

The building is faced with Texas Cordova limestone, and the doors to the building are of a specially cast aluminum. The lobby is walled with lightly veined marble. The gateways to the Tax Department are inlaid with bronze, nickel and silver. The elevator lobbies are treated with marble base, walls and wainscoting.

Above the lobby entrance is a stone sculpture depicting two men taming a wild horse, which is meant to symbolize a community coming together to form a government to tame the world around them. The plaster cast for this sculpture, and twenty-seven casts for friezes around the building, were done by Beaumont artist Herring Coe and co-designer Raoul Josset.

Hermann Square
The front of the city hall building steps down to a small park, George and Martha Hermann Square, which is dominated by a reflecting pool. That was once the homestead of George H. Hermann for whom Hermann Park in the Museum District is named. Hermann Square contains a simple, but regal elegance and is regularly used for festivals, protests and concerts. To accommodate larger events, the reflecting pool is planked over and tents and kiosks are often erected.

Although there is some speculation about whether or not people are allowed to stay in the park overnight, the Parks Department officially says that people are not permitted to sleep there. In 1987, the city attorney's office stated in the Houston Chronicle that the police are not to arrest anyone sleeping in the park.

References

External links

Houston City Hall at CityMayors.com
A collection of historical photographs about Houston, nearby communities, and more can be found at the University of Houston Digital Library

Skyscraper office buildings in Houston
History of Houston
City halls in Texas
National Register of Historic Places in Houston
Clock towers in Texas
Works Progress Administration in Texas
Joseph Finger buildings
City and town halls on the National Register of Historic Places in Texas
Downtown Houston